Ann Lininger (born 1968) is an American attorney, politician, and jurist serving as a judge on the circuit court in Clackamas County in the U.S. state of Oregon. Prior to being appointed as judge, she was a member of the Oregon House of Representatives from the 38th district, which includes most of Lake Oswego and portions of southwestern Portland.

Early life and education
Lininger was born in Ashland, Oregon. She earned a Bachelor of Arts degree from Yale University and a Juris Doctor from the New York University School of Law.

Career 
Lininger served as a judicial law clerk for federal judges on the U.S. District Court and the U.S. Court of Appeals for the 10th Circuit. She practiced law at Earthjustice and at Hogan Lovells in Colorado. After returning to Oregon, Lininger practiced law at Legal Aid Services of Oregon, Oregon Iron Works, Buckley Law, and the Metropolitan Public Defender. She served as a program officer at the Meyer Memorial Trust, directing programs on financing charitable real estate projects and promoting access to affordable housing.

Politics
In early 2009, Lininger was appointed to fill Martha Schrader's seat on the Clackamas County Board of Commissioners when Schrader was appointed to the Oregon Senate. Lininger won a contested election in 2010 to hold the seat, and she did not seek re-election in 2012. Lininger subsequently worked as general counsel and vice president at Oregon Iron Works.

In December 2013, Chris Garrett resigned from his seat in the Oregon House of Representatives to take a seat on the Oregon Court of Appeals. In January 2014, county commissioners of Multnomah County and Clackamas County (both of which are represented by the House seat) unanimously voted to appoint Lininger to fill Garrett's seat.

Lininger won re-election to her legislative seat in 2014 without opposition. She was named a co-chair of a joint legislative committee to oversee the implementation of Ballot Measure 91, which legalized marijuana and she served on the House Judiciary and House Revenue committees. Lininger won a contested election in 2016 to retain her legislative seat, and she thereafter served as Chair of the House Economic Development and Trade Committee, Co-chair of the Joint Committee on Marijuana Regulation, and as a member of the House Judiciary Committee. From 2014-2016, Lininger served as an assistant majority leader in the House Democrats' leadership team.

Circuit Court
In July 2017, Oregon Governor Kate Brown appointed Lininger to the circuit court in Clackamas County. She resigned from the House effective August 15 and was sworn in on August 28.

Personal
Lininger and her husband, David White, have two children and live in Portland.

References

External links
 Legislative website
 Project VoteSmart biography

Members of the Oregon House of Representatives
County commissioners in Oregon
Politicians from Ashland, Oregon
Politicians from Lake Oswego, Oregon
Oregon state court judges
Yale University alumni
New York University School of Law alumni
Living people
1968 births
21st-century American politicians
People associated with Hogan Lovells